Anna-Maria Wagner (born 17 May 1996) is a German judoka. She won the gold medal in the women's 78 kg event at the 2021 World Judo Championships held in Budapest, Hungary. She also won one of the bronze medals in both the women's 78 kg and mixed team events at the 2020 Summer Olympics held in Tokyo, Japan.

In 2018, she won one of the bronze medals in her event at the European Judo Championships held in Tel Aviv, Israel. She also competed at the World Judo Championships in 2017, 2018 and 2019.

In 2021, she competed in the women's 78 kg event at the Judo World Masters held in Doha, Qatar. A month later, she won the gold medal in her event at the 2021 Judo Grand Slam Tel Aviv held in Tel Aviv, Israel.

She won the gold medal in her event at the 2022 Judo Grand Slam Antalya held in Antalya, Turkey.

Career
Anna-Maria Wagner started practicing judo in the 2nd grade. After her first class, she signed up with a club immediately. Wagner won the Judo World Championship defeating the number one ranked competitor from France, Madeleine Malonga, to capture the gold medal.

Upon winning the World Championship, Anna-Maria Wagner punched her ticket to The Olympic Games in Tokyo.

References

External links

 

Living people
1996 births
People from Ravensburg
Sportspeople from Tübingen (region)
German female judoka
European Games competitors for Germany
Judoka at the 2019 European Games
World judo champions
Olympic judoka of Germany
Judoka at the 2020 Summer Olympics
Medalists at the 2020 Summer Olympics
Olympic medalists in judo
Olympic bronze medalists for Germany
21st-century German women